A platform-independent model (PIM) in software engineering is a model of a software system or business system that is independent of the specific technological platform used to implement it. 

The term platform-independent model is most frequently used in the context of the model-driven architecture approach. This model-driven architecture approach corresponds to the Object Management Group vision of model-driven engineering. 

The main idea is that it should be possible to use a model transformation language to transform a platform-independent model into a platform-specific model.  In order to achieve this transformation, one can use a language compliant to the newly defined QVT standard. Examples of such languages are VIATRA or ATLAS Transformation Language. It means execution of the program is not restricted by the type of operating system used.

Related concepts 
 Domain-specific modelling
 Eclipse Modeling Framework
 Generic Modeling Environment
 Graphical Modeling Framework
 Interaction Flow Modeling Language
 Kermeta
 KM3
 Meta-modeling
 Model Transformation Language
 OCL
 Platform-specific model
 SmartQVT
 SysML
 Unified Modeling Language
 XMI

References 

Software architecture